The Płonia is a river in West Pomeranian Voivodeship, Poland, a right tributary of the Oder river, with a length of 74.3 km and a basin area of 1101 km2. Its source is 1.5 south of Barlinek. The river flows northwest through Miedwie and Płoń lake. The Płonia flows into Dąbie Lake in Dąbie, Szczecin.

The upper portion of Płonia is comparatively unpolluted, therefore trout can be found there.

References

Rivers of Poland
Rivers of West Pomeranian Voivodeship